Kümüx (Kumishi;  / ) is a town in Toksun County, Turpan Prefecture, Xinjiang, China.


Name
'Kümüx' means 'silver' in Uyghur. Silver is mined in the area.

Kümüx has also been written in Chinese characters as Kumushi ( /  and  / ).

History
In 1984, Kümüx Town was established.

In December 2010, Zeng Lingquan, who ran an adoption agency for the physically and mentally disabled with no operation license in Sichuan, was arrested. Zeng reportedly sent the mentally ill to work in a factory run by Li Xinglin where they were enslaved and worked year round (instead of seasonally as with other local factories) in unsafe conditions at the Jia'ersi Green Construction Material Chemical Factory in Kümüx.

Geography
The nearby Kuruktag (Kuluketage; 库鲁克塔格) mountains (at around ) are a source of gold, silver, copper, lead, zinc, iron and other metals as well as asbestos, marble, mengfeitu, limestone, table salt, mirabilite, gypsum and quartz.

Administrative divisions
Kümüx includes one residential community and two villages:

Residential community:
Kümüx (Kumishi)

Villages:
 Qirghiz tam (Ke'erkezitiemi;  / )
Yëngi bostan (Yingbositan;  / )

Economy
Kümüx is an important stop on the road from Ürümqi to Kashgar. There are restaurants, a transport and shipping station, a regional weather station, hotel, post office, gas station, etc. There is little arable land in the surrounding area and spring water is used in irrigation.

Demographics

, more than 600 persons lived in Kümüx, mostly Uyghur. , 88.1% of the population of Kümüx were Uyghur.

During the Qing Dynasty, Kümüx was described as having twenty or more households.

Transportation
 China National Highway 314
 S24 Shanku Expressway

Historical maps 
Historical English-language maps including Kümüx:

References

Populated places in Xinjiang
Township-level divisions of Xinjiang